Tom-Christer Nilsen (born 28 August 1969) is a Norwegian politician for the Conservative Party and county mayor of Hordaland. He has been a member of Hordaland county council since 1995 and group chairman for the Conservatives since 2001.

Before becoming a full-time politician he worked for Avinor at Bergen Airport, Flesland. He was educated at the Norwegian School of Economics and Business Administration and resides in Askøy.

He is a son of Oddvard Nilsen.

References

1969 births
Living people
Conservative Party (Norway) politicians
Hordaland politicians
Norwegian School of Economics alumni
People from Askøy